Marie Khemesse Ngom Ndiaye is a Senegalese doctor and politician.

Education 
She graduated from Cheikh Anta Diop University in 1991.

Career 
During the COVID-19 pandemic in Senegal, she served as Director of Public Health at the Ministry of Health.

In May 2022, she was appointed Minister of Health in the Fourth Sall government, replacing Abdoulaye Diouf Sarr who was sacked.

She was nominated again to her post as Minister of Health on September 17, 2022 under the new cabinet formed by Prime Minister Amadou Bâ.

References 

Living people
Cheikh Anta Diop University alumni
21st-century Senegalese politicians
21st-century Senegalese women politicians
Health ministers of Senegal
Senegalese public health doctors
Senegalese women physicians
COVID-19 pandemic in Senegal
Women government ministers of Senegal
Year of birth missing (living people)
Women public health doctors